The Heritage Hotel is a heritage-listed pub at 240 Princes Highway, Bulli, City of Wollongong, New South Wales, Australia. It was designed by William Kerwood and built in 1889. It was historically known as the Family Hotel or Bulli Family Hotel. It was added to the New South Wales State Heritage Register on 2 April 1999.

History 

The hotel was designed by Kenwood and Kerle and built by contractors McDonald Brothers at a cost of £3,078 for landlord George Croft. William Tory Dickson, formerly the proprietor of the New Brighton Hotel at Lady Robinsons Beach, became the first licensee. The hotel featured a "public bar, several parlours, dining room, billiard room, and 28 bedrooms". It was licensed on 28 September 1889. The Sydney Mail praised its "colossal proportions and replete appointments".

It closed on 1 April 1976, but was bought and restored by a new owner and reopened in January 1984. The name of the hotel was changed to the Heritage Hotel on 8 August 2000.

Description 
The Heritage Hotel is a Victorian Filigree boom style, 3 storey corner hotel building with verandahs, dormers and a central tower with iron lace.

Heritage listing 
The hotel is a key townscape element and part of the Bulli streetscape. It is a fine and unusual example of this period in this area which reflects changes wrought in Bulli by coming of the railway; South of Old Bulli. It has a high level of architectural significance as one of the best examples of this type of Victorian period hotel in Australia.

Family Hotel was listed on the New South Wales State Heritage Register on 2 April 1999, having been found to have historic, landmark, architectural, townscape, cultural and social value, and to be both rare and representative.

See also

References

Bibliography

Attribution 

New South Wales State Heritage Register
Pubs in New South Wales
Articles incorporating text from the New South Wales State Heritage Register
Buildings and structures in Wollongong